Seagram Miller (April 13, 1970 – July 31, 1996) was an American rapper from Oakland, California, United States.

Seagram released two albums, The Dark Roads  (1992) and Reality Check (1994). He was killed in a drive-by shooting on July 31, 1996, which remains unsolved. He is interred in Oakland. A posthumous album, Souls on Ice, was released in 1997.

Discography

Studio albums
The Dark Roads (1992)
Reality Check (1994)

Posthumous studio albums
Souls on Ice (1997)

Compilation albums
Greatest Hits (2009)
Bay Business Soundtrack (2016)

Singles
"The Vill" (from the album The Dark Roads) (1992)
"The Dark Roads" (from the album The Dark Roads) (1992)
"Eastside" (from the album Reality Check) (1994)
"If the World Was Mine" (from the album Souls on Ice) (1997)

Music videos
"The Vill" (from the album The Dark Roads) (1992)
"The Dark Roads" (from the album The Dark Roads) (1992)
"Eastside" (from the album Reality Check) (1994)
"If the World Was Mine" (from the album Souls on Ice) (1997)

Guest appearances

See also
 List of murdered hip hop musicians

References

External links 
Seagram at Discogs

1970 births
1996 deaths
1996 murders in the United States
20th-century American male musicians
20th-century American rappers
African-American male rappers
American murder victims
Crimes in Oakland, California
Deaths by firearm in California
Gangsta rappers
G-funk artists
Male murder victims
Murdered African-American people
People murdered in California
Rap-A-Lot Records artists
Rappers from Oakland, California
Unsolved murders in the United States
Virgin Records artists
West Coast hip hop musicians
20th-century African-American musicians